Events from the year 1806 in Sweden

Incumbents
 Monarch – Gustav IV Adolf

Events
 6 November - Swedish defeat at Lübeck in the Franco-Swedish War.
 - The constructing of the Södertälje Canal begun. 
 - The Royal Swedish Opera and the Royal Swedish Ballet are closed down by the King and remain closed until 1809.
 - The steam engine is introduced in Stockholm at the Eldkvarn gristmill.
 - Helena Ekblom becomes active as a preacher.

Births
 22 January - Ludvig Manderström, Swedish - Norwegian Minister of State for Foreign Affairs   (died 1873)
 1 July - Clara Bonde, courtier  (died 1899)
 14 August - Cecilia Fryxell, educator  (died 1883)
 4 November - Anders Selinder, ballet master  (died 1874)
 Marie Kinnberg, photographer and painter (died 1858)

Deaths

 22 August - Conrad Quensel,  naturalist  (born 1767)
 - Christina Krook, educator  (born 1742)

References

 
Years of the 19th century in Sweden
Sweden